Jabali is a character in the ancient Indian epic Ramayana. A learned Brahmin priest and an advisor of King Dasharatha, he unsuccessfully tries to persuade Rama to give up his exile, using rational arguments.

Attempt to persuade Rama 

In Ramayana, Rama abandons his claim to the royal throne and goes on a 14-year exile, in order to fulfill his father's promise. Rama considers his decision as his dharma (righteous duty), necessary for his father's honour. In Ayodhya Khanda, Jabali accompanies Bharata to the forest, as part of a group that tries to convince Rama to give up his exile.

Jabali uses nihilist and atheistic reasoning to dissuade Rama from continuing the exile. He states that those give up artha (material pleasures) for the sake of dharma suffer in this life and meet extinction after their death. Showing further disbelief in the concept of afterlife, he criticizes the shraddha ritual, in which people offer food to their dead ancestors. He calls it a wastage of food, and sarcastically suggests that if food eaten by one person at a given place could nourish another person at another place, shraddha should be conducted for those going on long journeys, so they would not need to eat anything. However, even after listening to the arguments of Jabali and others, Rama refuses to give up his exile and extols the virtues of following the dharma.

Rama's response 

Valmiki's Ramayana contains a section that describes Rama angrily denouncing Jabali, which includes the following verses:

In these and subsequent verses, Rama becomes so angry that he denounces his own father for keeping Jabali as an adviser. He accuses Jabali of being an atheist, and states that those following the nastika path deserve to be punished. In the subsequent verses, he emphasizes the importance of following the dharma. Jabali then retracts his statements, saying that he was merely arguing like a nihilist to convince Rama to come back, but he is not actually a nihilist. Vashistha supports Jabali, stating that he was speaking in the interest of Rama.

Interpolation 

The verses depicting Rama's anger are considered a later insertion in Valimiki's original text. Every canto of Ramayana ends with one long shloka written in a different metre, compared to the other verses. However, the version of the canto containing these verses contains six long shlokas in a different metre. The dialogue between Rama and Jabali is finished in the first shloka, in which Rama is not depicted as annoyed. However, the next few shlokas re-open the dialogue abruptly, and the tone of the conversation contradicts the tone of the earlier dialogue. In his translation, Griffith calls these lines "manifestly spurious" and cautions that these need to be "regarded with suspicion". August Wilhelm Schlegel, who translated Ramayana to German (1829), also called these lines fake, and later regretted having included them in his translation.

According to Jayantanuja Bandyopadhyaya, Rama's outburst against Jabali in these verses is an example of "Brahmanical counteroffensive against all anti-Vedic ideals and movements". Although Rama appears to identify Jabali's views as Buddhist, Jabali's arguments reflect the Charvaka  school of thought. William Theodore de Bary calls Jabali's speech a parody of Buddhist scepticism and antinomianism.

References 

Characters in the Ramayana